Zeuctophlebia squalidata is a species of moth of the family Geometridae first described by Francis Walker in 1863. It is found in Australia.

References

Moths described in 1863
Oenochrominae